Carlton Carter (born 19 November 1972) is a Jamaican cricketer. He played in two first-class matches for the Jamaican cricket team in 1988/89 and 1989/90.

See also
 List of Jamaican representative cricketers

References

External links
 

1972 births
Living people
Jamaican cricketers
Jamaica cricketers
Place of birth missing (living people)